Sagana is a small industrial town in Kirinyaga District, Central, Kenya. It is along the Nairobi-Nyeri highway, 100 kilometres north of Nairobi, the capital of Kenya. Its name comes from Kenya's longest river, Sagana River which is also called Thagana. The town also inspired the rhumba song "Afro mtoto wa Sagana". The town and its surroundings has a growing hospitality industry along the riverline of the River Sagana with cottages, water sports and other tourist attractions being established.

Notable businesses 
 NAPOLEONS RAFTING CAMP SAGANA
 Sagana Country Lodge
 Highcrest Preparatory School
 Sagana Fisheries
 Sagana Tanneries Limited 
 Havila Resort
 Suncity Resort
 Bethany House
 Frapa Leisure Gardens & Hotel
 Mutisky  Motel  and  Lodge
 Apollo tours
 Maguna's Supermarket

Climate 

Sagana has 2 distinct rainy seasons and dry weather throughout the year. Average 30 year annual rainfall is 1,166 mm.

The warmest period is February through April with a distinct cool season between June and August, when rainfall is at a minimum. Even though there is little rain, the skies tend to be overcast much of the day during this period. A rainy period known as the “short rains” occurs between October and December. The “long rains” fall from March through May with a single-month peak of 500 mm or more in April.

Temperatures 
Daily average: 17 to 23 °C
Cool season average: 17 to 19 °C
Warm season average: 19 to 23 °C
Daily minimum: 14 to 19 °C
Daily maximum: 20 to 30 °C

Topography 
Sagana is situated at the edge of a large plain at the southern foot of Mt. Kenya. Soils were formed on volcanic rocks from Mt. Kenya — latest Pliocene to Pleistocene basalts, phonolites, and pyroclastics. In areas with free drainage conditions on moderate to steep slopes, lateritic and red to reddishbrown soils are present. Some areas with black cotton soils indicate that the soils have formed under restricted drainage conditions, which are the result of low rainfall and the presence of level to moderate slopes.

History

The town is known to have started in the early 19th Century. Sagana was home to the only railway station in Kirinyaga district.

See also 
Sagana Lodge

References

Populated places in Central Province (Kenya)